Petunia Peak is a  mountain summit located in Jefferson County of Washington state.

Description

Petunia Peak is set in the northeastern Olympic Mountains, and is situated on the boundary shared by Olympic National Park with the Buckhorn Wilderness, on land partially managed by the Olympic National Forest. Precipitation runoff from Petunia Peak drains into tributaries of the Dungeness River, and topographic relief is significant as the east aspect rises 3,750 feet (1,143 m) above the river in approximately 1.7 mile, and the west aspect rises 2,000 feet above Royal Basin in less than one mile. Old-growth forests of Douglas fir, western hemlock, and western redcedar grow on the lower slopes surrounding the peak. Like the town of Sequim 17 miles to the north, Petunia Peak lies in the rain shadow of the Olympic Mountains. It is also called "Petunia Peaks", as a higher summit known as North Petunia Peak (6,998 ft) rises 0.6 mile (1 km) to the north. This landform's name has not been officially adopted by the U.S. Board on Geographic Names, so the mountain is not labeled on USGS maps.

Climate

Petunia Peak is located in the marine west coast climate zone of western North America. Most weather fronts originate in the Pacific Ocean, and travel east toward the Olympic Mountains. As fronts approach, they are forced upward by the peaks of the Olympic Range, causing them to drop their moisture in the form of rain or snowfall (Orographic lift). As a result, the Olympics experience high precipitation, especially during the winter months in the form of snowfall. During winter months, weather is usually cloudy, but due to high pressure systems over the Pacific Ocean that intensify during summer months, there is often little or no cloud cover during the summer. The months July through September offer the most favorable weather for viewing or climbing this peak.

Gallery

See also

 Geology of the Pacific Northwest

References

External links
 Petunia Peak photo: Flickr
 Buckhorn Wilderness: fs.usda.gov

Mountains of Washington (state)
Olympic Mountains
Landforms of Jefferson County, Washington
North American 2000 m summits
Landforms of Olympic National Park